Stanislav Aleksandrovich Belkovsky (born 7 February 1971, Moscow, Soviet Union) is a Russian political analyst and communication specialist. He is a founder and director of the National Strategy Institute. He considers himself to be of Russian, Ukrainian, Polish and Jewish ethnicity. He is best known for his theatrical demeanor, humorous comportment, and deadpan style. In interviews and public talks, Belkovsky's trademark is mixing fast-paced political discussion with almost-nonsensical, absurdist statements laced with sarcasm, calling into question how 'serious' the preceding analysis was.

Belkovsky is a commentator on a variety of political issues, including Russian oligarchs, such as Mikhail Khodorkovsky. In 2003 Belkovsky co-authored a paper entitled "State and Oligarchy" which many considered as the ideological justification of Mikhail Khodorkovsky's arrest and trial. In 2005 Belkovsky announced that he is co-authoring a book with Eduard Limonov, at the time the head of the National-Bolshevik Party. Belkovsky has published allegations about Vladimir Putin's personal wealth, according to which Putin "controls a 4.5% stake in Gazprom, 37% in Surgutneftegas" as well as 50% in the oil-trading company Gunvor run by his close friend Gennady Timchenko. He coined the journalistic cliché "Puting" (Путинг), derived from the name of Russia's president from 2000-2008 and 2012–present, to denote the process of the renationalisation of Russia's oil industry assets.

Belkovsky, referring to the "pee tape" allegation in the Steele dossier, said that "Prostitutes around the city say the 'golden shower' orgy story is true."

References

External links
 Stanislav Belkovsky's interview with Russia Today Russia Today 1 June 2007.
 Belkovsky's publications

1971 births
Living people
20th-century Russian Jews
21st-century Russian Jews
Journalists from Moscow
State University of Management alumni
Russian activists against the 2022 Russian invasion of Ukraine
Russian Jews
Russian people of Polish descent
Russian political scientists